Sir David Alan Hopwood  (born 19 August 1933) is a British microbiologist and geneticist.

Education
Educated at Purbrook Park County High School and Lymm Grammar School, Hopwood gained his Bachelor of Arts degree from St John's College, Cambridge and his PhD from the University of Glasgow in 1973.

Career
Hopwood served as an assistant lecturer in genetics at Cambridge until he became a Lecturer in Genetics at the University of Glasgow in 1961. He later became John Innes Professor of Genetics at the University of East Anglia. He is now an Emeritus Fellow in the Department of Molecular Microbiology at the John Innes Centre.

Awards and honours
Hopwood was awarded the Gabor Medal in 1995 "in recognition of his pioneering and leading the growing field of the genetics of Streptomyces coelicolor A3(2), and for developing the programming of the pervasive process of polyketide synthesis". In 2002, he co-authored the sequencing of the S. coelicolor A3(2) genome. During more than forty years he has been studying the genetics and molecular biology of the model actinomycete S. coelicolor.

Hopwood was elected a Fellow of the Royal Society in 1979  and delivered their Leeuwenhoek Lecture in 1987. He is also the author of Streptomyces in Nature and Medicine: The Antibiotic Makers.

His nomination for the Royal Society reads:

References

1933 births
Living people
Alumni of St John's College, Cambridge
Academics of the University of Glasgow
Academics of the University of East Anglia
Fellows of the Royal Society
Members of the European Molecular Biology Organization
Foreign Fellows of the Indian National Science Academy
Knights Bachelor
Fellows of the American Academy of Microbiology